Gunnar Johansson (1906–1991) was a Swedish composer, conductor and professor. He composed many film scores for the Swedish film industry. He also taught at the Royal College of Music in Stockholm.

Selected filmography

 Augusta's Little Misstep (1933)
 Good Friends and Faithful Neighbours (1938)
 Kiss Her! (1940)
 With Open Arms (1940)
 One, But a Lion! (1940)
 June Night (1940)
 Goransson's Boy (1940)
 The Crazy Family (1940)
 The Fight Continues (1941)
 Bright Prospects (1941)
 The Train Leaves at Nine (1941)
 Poor Ferdinand (1941)
 Dunungen (1941)
 We're All Errand Boys (1941)
 Tonight or Never (1941)
 It Is My Music (1942)
 Little Napoleon (1943)
 Katrina (1943)
 In Darkest Smaland (1943)
 My People Are Not Yours (1944)
 Prince Gustaf (1944)
 Count Only the Happy Moments (1944)
 Maria of Kvarngarden (1945)
 The Serious Game (1945)
 The Girls in Smaland (1945)
 Black Roses (1945)
 Life in the Finnish Woods (1947)
 Private Karlsson on Leave (1947)
 The Poetry of Ådalen (1947)
 The Bride Came Through the Ceiling (1947)
 The Night Watchman's Wife (1947)
 Sunshine (1948)

References

Bibliography
 Rasmussen, Bjørn. Filmens hvem-vad-hvor: Udenlanske film 1950-1967. Politiken, 1968.

External links

1906 births
1991 deaths
Swedish composers